Hyperplatys argentinus is a species of longhorn beetle of the subfamily Lamiinae. It was described by Carlos Berg in 1889 and is known from Argentina and Uruguay.

References

Beetles described in 1889
Beetles of South America
Acanthocinini